Ludivina García Arias (born ) is a Mexican-Spanish politician and member of the Spanish Socialist Workers Party (PSOE). Having emigrated from Mexico to Spain in the 1970s, she was a Member of the Congress of Deputies for Asturias from 1979 to 1986, and from 2000 to 2004. From 1987 until 1999, she was a Member of the European Parliament.

Life and career
Ludivina García Arias was born in December 1945 to Asturian parents in Morelia in the Mexican state of Michoacán. She studied history at the National Autonomous University of Mexico and moved to Spain towards the end of the Francoist dictatorship. She worked as a secondary school teacher.

García Arias joined the PSOE in 1972, and was elected to the Congress of Deputies for Asturias in the 1979 general election. She remained in this office until 1986. In 1987, she was elected to represent Spain at the European Parliament. She had this role until the 1999 European Parliament election. In 2000, she was again elected to the Congress of Deputies. Her political career ended in 2004.

References

MEPs for Spain 1987–1989
People from Morelia
Spanish Socialist Workers' Party MEPs
1945 births
MEPs for Spain 1989–1994
MEPs for Spain 1994–1999
Living people
Politicians from Michoacán
National Autonomous University of Mexico alumni
20th-century Spanish politicians
20th-century Spanish women politicians
21st-century Spanish politicians
21st-century Spanish women politicians